is a Japanese judoka, who competed in the men's half-middleweight category. He picked up a bronze medal in the 81-kg division at the 2004 Asian Judo Championships in Almaty, Kazakhstan, and later represented his nation Japan at the 2004 Summer Olympics.

Tomouchi qualified for the Japanese squad in the men's half-middleweight class (81 kg) at the 2004 Summer Olympics in Athens, by placing third and receiving a berth from the Asian Championships in Almaty, Kazakhstan. He got off to a rough start with a waza-ari awasete ippon defeat from Russia's Dmitri Nossov in his opening match, but bounced back to compete for the bronze medal after Nossov qualified for the final. In the repechage round, Tomouchi could not tightly grapple Italy's Roberto Meloni with a kata guruma (shoulder wheel), and lost the match again after the five-minute limit.

References

External links
 
 

1977 births
Living people
Japanese male judoka
Olympic judoka of Japan
Judoka at the 2004 Summer Olympics
Judoka at the 2002 Asian Games
People from Ōmuta, Fukuoka
Sportspeople from Fukuoka Prefecture
Asian Games competitors for Japan
20th-century Japanese people
21st-century Japanese people